Nicolae Simion (born 17 May 1952) is a Romanian rower. He competed at the 1976 Summer Olympics and the 1980 Summer Olympics.

References

External links
 

1952 births
Living people
Romanian male rowers
Olympic rowers of Romania
Rowers at the 1976 Summer Olympics
Rowers at the 1980 Summer Olympics
World Rowing Championships medalists for Romania